The Ugandan passport is a document issued to citizens of Uganda for international travel.

History 

Passports with the name Uganda written upon them or used by Ugandan citizens were first used in the 1940s although they were mainly used by Asians and Afro-British nationals. The passport was a British titled passport but in the location it mentioned Uganda. At this time Uganda was still a British Protectorate but unlike Kenya it was slightly more self-governing. Uganda became an independent Dominion on 9 October 1962, then a republic on 9 October 1963 and it is from that day that all the passports have the title of Republic of Uganda Passports. But since 1986 the current terms of the passport haven't changed hence enabling any Ugandan citizen travel freely to any country of their choosing.

Issuance 

Under the Uganda Citizenship and Immigration Control Act 2009, Ugandan passports and other travel documents may only be issued to and held individuals that are proven to be citizens of Uganda . This is overseen by a passport control officer and a deputy passport control officer

They are processed and issued only by Government of Uganda through the Directorate of Immigration Control (DCIC).

Visa requirements

As of 1 January 2017, Ugandan citizens had visa-free or visa on arrival access to 61 countries and territories, ranking the Ugandan passport 75th in terms of travel freedom (tied with Filipino passport) according to the Henley visa restrictions index.

Types of passport

Ordinary

Diplomatic

Validity 

The Passports Act 1982 set the validity of the Ugandan passport at 5 years. This has since been increased to 10 years under a provision of

Withdrawal 

Part V, Section 47, Sub Section 1 of The Uganda Citizenship and Immigration Control Act 2009 sets out the conditions under which a Ugandan passport can be temporarily withdrawn or seized from the holder

 where the holder is lawfully charged with a felony;
 where the holder is a habitual criminal;
 where the holder is deported or repatriated to Uganda and the conditions or reasons for his or her deportation or repatriation are still standing; and
 subject to the Constitution, any other circumstance which, in the opinion of the board, would be prejudicial to the interests of the State or of the holder of the passport.

Current 

The Government of Uganda introduced new e-passports as of January 2019. The new e-Passports are presented in the following colours: Slay Blue (Ordinary Passport), Green (Service Passport) and Red (Diplomatic Passport).

Other travel documents 

 Temporary Movement Permit
 Certificate of Identity

List of passports
Visa requirements for Ugandan citizens
Visa policy of Uganda

References

Passports by country
Government of Uganda
Foreign relations of Uganda
Uganda and the Commonwealth of Nations